The Pangasinan people, also known as Pangasinense, are an ethnolinguistic group native to the Philippines. Numbering 1,823,865 in 2010, they are the tenth largest ethnolinguistic group in the country. They live mainly in their native province of Pangasinan and the adjacent provinces of La Union and Tarlac, as well as Benguet, Nueva Ecija, Zambales, and Nueva Vizcaya. Smaller groups are found elsewhere in the Philippines and worldwide in the Filipino diaspora.

Etymology
The name Pangasinan means "land of salt" or "place of salt-making". It is derived from asin, the word for "salt" in Pangasinan. The Pangasinan people are referred as Pangasinense. The term Pangasinan can refer to the indigenous speakers of the Pangasinan language or people of Pangasinan heritage.

Demographics

The estimated population of the Pangasinan people in the province of Pangasinan is 2.5 million. The Pangasinan people are also living in the neighboring provinces of Tarlac and La Union (which used to be parts of Pangasinan Province), Benguet, Nueva Ecija, Zambales, and Nueva Vizcaya; as well as in Pangasinan communities in the Philippines and overseas.

Indigenous religion

Prior to Spanish colonization, the Pangasinan people believed in a pantheon of unique deities (gods and goddesses).

Immortals 

Ama: the supreme deity, ruler of others, and the creator of mankind; sees everything through his aerial abode; father of Agueo and Bulan also referred as Ama-Gaolay
Agueo: the morose and taciturn sun god who is obedient to his father, Ama; lives in a palace of light
Bulan: the merry and mischievous moon god, whose dim palace was the source of the perpetual light which became the stars; guides the ways of thieves

Mortals

Urduja: a warrior princess who headed a supreme fleet

Notable individuals
Urduja was a legendary woman warrior who is regarded as a heroine in Pangasinan.  Malong and Palaris fought for independence from Spanish rule. Other prominent people of Pangasinan descent include Fidel Ramos, born in Lingayen, he served in the Cabinet of President Corazón Aquino, first as chief-of-staff of the Armed Forces of the Philippines (AFP), and later on, as Secretary of National Defense from 1986 to 1991 before becoming the Philippine's 12th president. Tania Dawson whose mother hails from Santa Maria, Pangasinan,  lawmaker Jose de Venecia, Jr., who was born in Dagupan City, Pangasinan; and actor and presidential candidate Fernando Poe, Jr., whose father was from San Carlos City, Pangasinan. Other notable Pangasinenses are Victorio C. Edades, Angela Perez Baraquio, Ambrosio Padilla, Cheryl Cosim (reporter), Marc Pingris, and Ric Segreto. Notable Pangasinense actresses include Donita Rose, Marlou Aquino, Lolita Rodriguez, Barbara Perez, Gloria Romero, Carmen Rosales, Nova Villa, Jhong Hilario, and Liza Soberano.

See also
 Bagoong
 Bicolano people
 Caboloan
 Igorot people
 Ilocano people
 Ivatan people
 Kapampangan people
 Limahong
 Lumad
 Moro people
 Negrito
 Salt
 Sambal people
 Tagalog people
 Visayan people
 Cebuano people
 Boholano people
 Hiligaynon people
 Waray people

References

External links
 Sunday Punch
 Sun Star Pangasinan
 Pangasinan Star Online
 Borobudur Ship Expedition

Pangasinan
Ethnic groups in Luzon
Ethnic groups in the Philippines